The Guam men's national 3x3 team is a national basketball team of Guam, administered by the Guam Basketball Confederation.
It represents the country in international 3x3 (3 against 3) basketball competitions.

See also
Guam national basketball team
Guam women's national 3x3 team

References

Basketball in Guam
Basketball teams in Guam
Men's national 3x3 basketball teams
Basketball